Datan may refer to:

 Datan, Hebei (大滩镇), China
 Datan, Liaoning (大谭镇), in Pulandian, Liaoning, China
 An alternative spelling of the biblical figure Dathan